Eurysacca is a genus of moths in the family Gelechiidae.

Species
 Eurysacca acutivalva Povolný, 1986
 Eurysacca albonigra Povolný, 1986
 Eurysacca annulata Povolný, 1986
 Eurysacca atrata Povolný, 1986
 Eurysacca boertmanni Povolný, 1990
 Eurysacca chili (Povolný, 1967)
 Eurysacca danorum Povolný, 1986
 Eurysacca excisa Povolný, 1986
 Eurysacca gnorimina Povolný, 1986
 Eurysacca media Povolný, 1986
 Eurysacca melanocampta (Meyrick, 1917)
 Eurysacca melanopicta Povolný, 1986
 Eurysacca minima Povolný, 1986
 Eurysacca novalis Povolný, 1989
 Eurysacca paleana Povolný, 1986
 Eurysacca parvula Povolný, 1986
 Eurysacca splendida Povolný, 1986
 Eurysacca subatrata Povolný, 1986
 Eurysacca subsplendida Povolný, 1986
 Eurysacca quinoae Povolný, 1997
 Eurysacca tenebrosa Povolný, 1986
 Eurysacca vera Povolný, 1990

References

 
Gnorimoschemini